The 1998 Miller Lite 400 was the 14th stock car race of the 1998 NASCAR Winston Cup Series season and the 30th iteration of the event. The race was held on Sunday, June 14, 1998, in Brooklyn, Michigan, at Michigan International Speedway, a two-mile (3.2 km) moderate-banked D-shaped speedway. The race took the scheduled 200 laps to complete. In the late stages of the race, Roush Racing driver Mark Martin was able to dominate to take his 26th career NASCAR Winston Cup Series victory and his fourth of the season. To fill out the podium, Robert Yates Racing driver Dale Jarrett and Hendrick Motorsports driver Jeff Gordon would finish second and third, respectively.

Background 

The race was held at Michigan International Speedway, a two-mile (3.2 km) moderate-banked D-shaped speedway located in Brooklyn, Michigan. The track is used primarily for NASCAR events. It is known as a "sister track" to Texas World Speedway as MIS's oval design was a direct basis of TWS, with moderate modifications to the banking in the corners, and was used as the basis of Auto Club Speedway. The track is owned by International Speedway Corporation. Michigan International Speedway is recognized as one of motorsports' premier facilities because of its wide racing surface and high banking (by open-wheel standards; the 18-degree banking is modest by stock car standards).

Entry list 

 (R) denotes rookie driver.

Practice

First practice 
The first practice session was held on the afternoon of Friday, June 12.

Final practice 
The final practice session, sometimes referred to as Happy Hour, was held on the afternoon of Friday, June 13.

Qualifying 
Qualifying was split into two rounds. The first round was held on Friday, June 12, at 3:30 PM EST. Each driver would have one lap to set a time. During the first round, the top 25 drivers in the round would be guaranteed a starting spot in the race. If a driver was not able to guarantee a spot in the first round, they had the option to scrub their time from the first round and try and run a faster lap time in a second round qualifying run, held on Saturday, June 13, at 11:15 AM EST. As with the first round, each driver would have one lap to set a time. On January 24, 1998, NASCAR would announce that the amount of provisionals given would be increased from last season. Positions 26-36 would be decided on time, while positions 37-43 would be based on provisionals. Six spots are awarded by the use of provisionals based on owner's points. The seventh is awarded to a past champion who has not otherwise qualified for the race. If no past champion needs the provisional, the next team in the owner points will be awarded a provisional.

Four drivers would fail to qualify: Derrike Cope, Tony Raines, Dave Marcis, and Todd Bodine.

Full qualifying results

Race results

References 

1998 NASCAR Winston Cup Series
NASCAR races at Michigan International Speedway
June 1998 sports events in the United States
1998 in sports in Michigan